Lake Yarışlı is a lake in Turkey.

Yeşilova ilçe (district ) of Burdur Province is to the west of the lake. It is in a closed basin of Turkey which is popularly called Göller Yöresi ("the region of lakes"). Lake Burdur is to the north east, Lake Salda is to the west and Lake Karataş is to the south of Lake Yarışlı.

It is a salt lake. There is an islet in the eastern part of the lake. The archaeological site of Tymbrianassus is at the eastern shore of lake.

References

Yarasli
Yeşilova District
Landforms of Burdur Province
Important Bird Areas of Turkey